Cireşu is a commune located in Brăila County, Muntenia, Romania. It is composed of five villages: Batogu, Cireșu, Ionești, Scărlătești and Vultureni.

Batogu
Batogu, now a village of Cireșu, was a separate commune until 1968. The Batogu manor, built in the 1850s, was the seat of the Filotti family until 1947. Maria Filotti was born here in 1883.

References

Communes in Brăila County
Localities in Muntenia